Rocklyn railway station was on the Ballarat to Daylesford railway line in Victoria, Australia.   

On Boxing Day in 1914, the station was the scene of a "sensational shooting incident", in which a group of three young men, who had been shooting at a church bell and grown bored of the target, opened fire on a passing train and very nearly killed the guard.

References

Disused railway stations in Victoria (Australia)